Robert Mitchell Garber (September 10, 1928 – June 7, 1999) was an American professional baseball player. The right-handed pitcher had a highly successful minor league career, twice winning 20 games and notching one 19-victory season, but made only two appearances in Major League Baseball, for the 1956 Pittsburgh Pirates.

Garber's 20-win seasons came in 1949 and 1955. In 1949, he won ten games in the Class D Alabama State League and another ten after his promotion to the Class B Illinois–Indiana–Iowa League. During 1955, he went 20–16 at the top level of the minors with the Hollywood Stars of the Open-Classification Pacific Coast League, and led the PCL in strikeouts.  In 1954, with the Denver Bears, Garber won 19 of 27 decisions, led the Class A Western League in strikeouts, and was selected to the all-star team.  All told, he won 117 games, losing 81, during his nine-year career (1948–1950; 1953–1958).

In those four innings, he surrendered three hits (including a home run to Brooklyn's Gil Hodges) and one earned run, striking out three and issuing three bases on balls.

References

External links

1928 births
1999 deaths
Baseball players from Pennsylvania
Charleston Rebels players
Davenport Pirates players
Denver Bears players
Greenville Pirates players
Hollywood Stars players
Longview Pirates players
Major League Baseball pitchers
New Orleans Pelicans (baseball) players
People from Westmoreland County, Pennsylvania
Pittsburgh Pirates players
Portland Beavers players
Seattle Rainiers players
Waco Pirates players